The Italian ambassador in Helsinki is the official representative of the Government in Rome to the Government of Finland.

List of representatives 
<onlyinclude>

References 

 
Finland
Italy